Morena is a neighborhood in San Diego, California bordered by Bay Park to the north, Linda Vista to the east, Mission Bay to the west, and Mission Valley to the south. E. Mission Bay Drive forms the western boundary. The ZIP Code is 92110.

References
 

Neighborhoods in San Diego